The Bavarian A III 2-2-2 engines were German steam locomotives in service with the Royal Bavarian State Railways (Königlich Bayerische Staatsbahn).

Once again these engines were used to experiment with a short boiler and Meyer expansion valve gear. Because the additional increase in size of the heating area could not be improved by installing extra tubes, two of each were rebuilt to 0-4-2 and 0-6-2 locomotives. Otherwise their construction was the same as the Class A II engines.

They were equipped with 2 T 4.2 and, following the rebuild, 2 T 5 tenders.

See also
 List of Bavarian locomotives and railbuses

2-2-2 locomotives
A III
Railway locomotives introduced in 1851
Standard gauge locomotives of Germany
1A1 n2 locomotives
Passenger locomotives